Allied Artists may refer to:
 Allied Artists Pictures Corporation the historic movie company which started as Monogram Pictures and continued until the 1970s
 Allied Artists International, formerly Allied Artists Records